The 2019 Middle East Rally Championship was an international rally championship sanctioned by the FIA. The championship was to be contested over five events held in five Middle East countries from March to November. One event, the Cyprus Rally, is shared with the 2019 European Rally Championship. The season-ending Kuwait International Rally was cancelled.

Qatar's Nasser Al-Attiyah won his fifteenth MERC championship and his ninth consecutively. Al-Attiyah won all four rallies contested. Fellow Qatari driver Abdulaziz Al-Kuwari was second in the championship but scored less than half the points Al-Attiyah scored. Al-Kuwari was second in Qatar and Jordan but would score only four points for the rest of the season. Kuwaiti driver Meshari Al-Thefiri was again third in the championship.

Event calendar and results

The 2019 MERC was as follows:

Championship standings
The 2019 MERC for Drivers points was as follows:

References

External links

Middle East Rally Championship
Middle East
Middle East Rally Championship